O. longicauda may refer to:

Oedipina longicauda (a salamander)
Opistophthalmus longicauda (a scorpion)
Oxyurichthys longicauda (a Goby fish)